Propagation can refer to:
Chain propagation in a chemical reaction mechanism
Crack propagation, the growth of a crack during the fracture of materials
Propaganda, non-objective information used to further an agenda
Reproduction, and other forms of multiplication or increase
Plant propagation, the production of more plants
Propagation of schema, in artificial reproduction
Software propagation, the distribution of free software
Wave propagation, the motion of a wave
Radio propagation, the application of wave propagation to radio communications

In music
 Propagation (album)
"Propagation", a song by Lower Dens from the album Nootropics